Acts Church is a Charismatic church and contemporary worship music band founded by Pr. Kenneth Chin in the year 2000 in Subang Jaya, Malaysia. The church currently has over 3,000 attendees across 26 churches in 8 nations.

History
This Church began in 2000, when Pastor Kenneth Chin started this church in Subang Jaya, Malaysia. Over the years, the church has grown to over 26 churches in 8 countries. Acts Church also has a few ministries under it. Notably, Acts Teens, Acts Kids, Acts Working Adults, Acts Campus and Acts Family.

Music
In the year 2005, Acts Church released their first single titled God of Everything. Over the years, they have released multiple Albums and singles in English, Bahasa Melayu and Mandarin Chinese.

Discography

These albums and singles are independently recorded by Acts Church.

Albums
 Actsperiment 3.0: You Are Always Good (June 2010)
 Actsperiment 4.0: Fire Wall (November 2012)
 All to Jesus (June 2019)
 Hatiku Milikmu (2021)

Singles
 God of Everything (2005)
 I will Praise (2020)
 Guiding Light (2021)

See also 

Christianity in Malaysia
Pentecostalism
Worship service (evangelicalism)

References

External links
Acts Church official website

Protestantism in Malaysia
Charismatic denominations
Christian organizations established in the 2000s
Christian organizations established in the 21st century
Performers of contemporary worship music
Musical groups established in 2005